The 2008–09 season is Panathinaikos' 50th consecutive season in the Super League Greece. They have qualified for the UEFA Champions League second qualifying round for the 2008–09 season. The 2007–08 season ended with Jose Peseiro's removal from the team's bench. After a year's absence they will return to Athens Olympic Stadium for the season. On 27 May 2008 after two hours of conversations between Panathinaikos chairmen, it was decided that Nikos Pateras would take over as Panathinaikos president. On 13 June 2008 Panathinaikos announced that the new team coach will be Henk ten Cate for the next two years.

Squad

Squad changes for 2008/09 season

In:

 For £1,000,000 
 For €3,000,000 
 For €1,500,000 
 For €3,800,000  for player's rights
 For €2,300,000 
 For €2,200,000 
 For €2,000,000 
 For €1,500,000  for player's rights
 For €1,500,000 
 For €625,000 
 for €300,000 

total spending : €21,225,000  

Out:

 for €1,500,000 

Out on loan:

Club

Management

Other information

Pre-season and friendlies

Competitions

Super League Greece

Regular season

League table

Matches

UEFA play-offs

League table

Matches

Greek Cup

Fourth round

Fifth round

Quarter-finals

UEFA Champions League

Qualifying phase

Second qualifying round

Third qualifying round

Group B

Knockout stage

Round of 16

Statistics

Top scorers
 As of 7 March 2009 

 Source: pao.com Statistics

Most appearances
 As of 7 March 2009 

 Source: pao.com Statistics

Team kit

References

External links
 Panathinaikos FC official website

2008-09
Greek football clubs 2008–09 season